Julia Franziska Sauter (married name: Sauter-Czarnik; born 18 June 1997) is a German-Romanian figure skater. Representing Romania, she has won twelve senior international medals as well as five Romanian national titles. She has reached the final segment at one World and two European Championships, with a top-ten result at the 2023 Europeans.

Personal life
Born in Weingarten, Württemberg, Germany, Julia Sauter is a dual citizen of Germany and Romania. She married American ice hockey player Robbie Czarnik in September 2021.

Career

Early years 
Sauter represented Germany at junior international events in 2010 and 2011. In March 2013, she made her first international appearance for Romania. She competed at three consecutive World Junior Championships, from 2014 to 2016, but never made the cut for the free skate.

2018–19 season 
At the 2019 European Championships, she qualified to the final segment of an ISU Championship for the first time in her career. She went on to finish 14th overall.

2021–22 season 
Sauter won bronze at three events — the Trophée Métropole Nice Côte d'Azur in October 2021, Skate Helena in January 2022, and Dragon Trophy in February 2022. In March, she competed at the 2022 World Championships in Montpellier, France; she reached the free skate in 19th place and finished 18th overall.

2022–23 season 
Sauter was invited to her first Grand Prix event, the 2022 MK John Wilson Trophy, where she placed tenth. She won silver medals at the Bosphorus Cup, Crystal Skate of Romania, and EduSport Trophy. At the 2023 European Championships, she achieved a top-ten finish for Romania.

Programs

Competitive highlights 
GP: Grand Prix; CS: Challenger Series; JGP: Junior Grand Prix

For Romania

For Germany

References

External links 

 

1997 births
German female single skaters
Romanian female single skaters
German people of Romanian descent
Living people
People from Weingarten, Württemberg
Sportspeople from Tübingen (region)